Amaravati Colony Junction railway station is a small railway station in Davanagere district, Karnataka. Its code is AVC. It serves Davangere and Harihar town. The station consists of three platforms. The platforms are not well sheltered.

Trains 

 Harihar–Hosapete Passenger

References 

Mysore railway division
Railway stations in Davanagere district